Lala Lala is the indie rock project of Chicago-based songwriter Lillie West (guitar, vocals).

Biography
Lillie West was raised in London and moved with her family to Los Angeles when she was a teenager. She would soon relocate to Chicago to attend the School of the Art Institute of Chicago and become involved with the city's underground music scene. A long time fan of music, it wasn't until West began college that she would begin to create music of her own after being encouraged by a friend to purchase a guitar from Craigslist.  According to her IMDb page, she has performed roles in films of her father, the Tomb Raider and Con Air director Simon West, while growing up.   Lillie described being the acclaimed filmmakers daughter to Paper Magazine in a 2018 interview, “My dad is a filmmaker, and he has filmed pretty much every moment of my life from when I was born.”

Career 
Lala Lala's debut album, Sleepyhead, was self-released in 2016 and was followed up by their sophomore album titled The Lamb, which was released in September 2018 on Sub Pop imprint Hardly Art. Upon the announcement of the band's second album, Stereogum gave Lala Lala the prestigious recognition of "Band to Watch" in July 2018. The release of Lala Lala's sophomore album, The Lamb, was met with favorable reviews by various notable publications, including Pitchfork, whose review by Steven Arroyo states that "On her second album, Lillie West retains the charming simplicity of her songs, but she finds new depth as a songwriter as she explores the act of standing up to herself," awarding the album with a high numerical score as well.

In January 2019, Lala Lala released a single titled "Siren 042," a collaboration with Yoni Wolf, frontman of the American band WHY?, which was premiered on the Fader and was reviewed well by music outlets. A writer for NPR, Adelaide Sandstrom, praises the collaboration, "Siren 042," writing that the song displays West's "ability to offset sharp lyricism with shimmering guitar and singalong-worthy vocal refrains."

In March 2019, Lala Lala set out on a nationwide tour opening for the Conor Oberst and Phoebe Bridgers duo Better Oblivion Community Center. Later in 2019, Lala Lala opened for Death Cab for Cutie on their U.S. Summer tour. It was announced that in July 2019, Lala Lala will perform at the Pitchfork Music Festival in Chicago

Discography

Studio albums
 Sleepyhead (2016, self-released)
 The Lamb (2018, Hardly Art)
 I Want the Door to Open (2021, Hardly Art)

EPs
 Lala Lala (2014, self-released)
 Have a Good Day (2015, self-released)

Singles
 "Siren 042" featuring WHY? (January 11, 2019)
 "Legs, Run" (January 21, 2020) 
 "Fantasy Movie" b/w Valentine featuring Grapetooth (February 12, 2020) 
 "€ € € €^^%%!!!!!heaven!!!!!!" featuring Baths (July 24, 2020)

References

External links

Year of birth missing (living people)
Living people
American indie pop musicians
School of the Art Institute of Chicago alumni
Musicians from London
Musicians from Chicago
Musicians from Los Angeles
British emigrants to the United States
21st-century American musicians
21st-century American women musicians
American women guitarists
American women singer-songwriters
American expatriates in England
Feminist musicians
Singer-songwriters from California
Singer-songwriters from Illinois